Bara Tehsil is a subdivision located in Khyber District, Khyber Pakhtunkhwa, Pakistan.

Geography

Adjacent administrative units 
Nazyan District, Nangarhar Province, Afghanistan (north)
Landi Kotal Tehsil (north)
Jamrud Tehsil (northeast)
Peshawar Tehsil, Peshawar District, Khyber Pakhtunkhwa (east)
Frontier Region Kohat (southeast)
Lower Orakzai Tehsil, Orakzai Agency (south)
Central Orakzai Tehsil, Orakzai Agency (south)
Upper Orakzai Tehsil, Orakzai Agency (southwest)
Central Kurram Tehsil, Kurram Agency (west)
Haska Meyna District, Nangarhar Province, Afghanistan (northwest)
Achin District, Nangarhar Province, Afghanistan (northwest)

Demographics 

Bara Tehsil has a population of 444,403 and has 51,869 households according to the 2017 census.

Education 
There are about 400 schools and colleges in Bara Tehsil. A total of 102 schools have been destroyed during a ten-year-long period of militancy in the region, and around 64,000 students have abandoned education.

Transportation 
Bara Tehsil is linked to Peshawar by the Peshawar-Bara road. Peshawar-Bara road was closed from 2009 to 2013 in an operation to contain growing militancy.

See also 
 List of tehsils of Khyber Pakhtunkhwa
 Bara, Khyber Pakhtunkhwa
 Bara Rifles

References 

Tehsils of Khyber Pakhtunkhwa
Populated places in Khyber District